Jean Zu is a Chinese-Canadian engineer, currently the dean of the Charles V. Schaefer, Jr. School of Engineering & Science at Stevens Institute of Technology in Hoboken, New Jersey. She is an Elected Fellow of the American Association for the Advancement of Science.

Career 
Dr. Jean Zu grew up in China where she earned her undergrad and master's degrees from Tsinghua University. and then enrolled for her Ph.D. in 1994 at the University of Manitoba. She secured a tenured track teaching position at the University of Toronto in Mechanical and Industrial Engineering. She was promoted to associate professor in 1999, full professor in 2004, and department chair in 2009. She has created over 300 refereed papers, 160 journal papers, and secured millions of dollars in grants for research. In 2017 she was named dean of the Charles V. Schaefer, Jr School of Engineering and Science Institute of Technology in Hoboken, New Jersey. In a school that has eight academic departments, 50 majors, 170 faculty, and 2400 students.  she is promoting science, technology, engineering and mathematics fields. She currently works on wave propagation of functional graded cylindrical nanoshells.

References

Year of birth missing (living people)
Living people
Fellows of the American Association for the Advancement of Science
Academic staff of the University of Toronto
21st-century American engineers
University of Manitoba alumni
American women engineers
21st-century women engineers
American women academics
21st-century American women